The 1978 NCAA Division I Basketball Championship Game was the finals of the 1978 NCAA Division I Basketball Tournament and it determined the national champion for the 1977–78 NCAA Division I season. The 1978 National Title Game was played on March 27, 1978, at The Checkerdome in St. Louis. The 1978 National Title Game was played between the 1978 Mideast Regional Champions, Kentucky and the 1978 East Regional Champions, Duke.

Participating teams

Duke

East
Duke 63, Rhode Island 62
Duke 84, Pennsylvania 80
Duke 90, Villanova 72
Final Four
Duke 90, Notre Dame 86

Kentucky

Mideast
Kentucky 85, Florida State 76
Kentucky 91, Miami (OH) 69
Kentucky 52, Michigan State 49
Final Four
Kentucky 64, Arkansas 59

Box score

References

NCAA Division I Basketball Championship Game
NCAA Division I Men's Basketball Championship Games
Duke Blue Devils men's basketball
Kentucky Wildcats men's basketball
Basketball competitions in St. Louis
College sports tournaments in Missouri
NCAA Division I Basketball Championship Game
NCAA Division I Basketball Championship Game, 1978
NCAA Division I Basketball Championship Game